Chabrian Jattan is a village in the Mirpur Tehsil of Mirpur District of Azad Kashmir, Pakistan.

Demography 

According to 1998 census of Pakistan, its population was  1941.

History 

Like in many villages in the Mirpur region, many villagers have emigrated to the United Kingdom. The population is made up of the Jarral Rajput and Jat communities..

References 

Populated places in Mirpur District